Razdolye is a rural locality (a village) and the administrative centre of Razdolyevsky Selsoviet, Krasnokamsky District, Bashkortostan, Russia. The population was 1,084 as of 2010. There are 20 streets.

Geography 
Razdolye is located 19 km east of Nikolo-Beryozovka (the district's administrative centre) by road. Kadrekovo is the nearest rural locality.

References 

Rural localities in Krasnokamsky District